Christian Rozeboom (born January 30, 1997) is an American football inside linebacker for the Los Angeles Rams of the National Football League (NFL). He played college football at South Dakota State.

College career
Rozeboom was a member of the South Dakota State Jackrabbits for five seasons, redshirting as a true freshman. He finished his collegiate career with a school-record 475 tackles with 29 tackles for loss, six sacks, eight forced fumbles, and eight interceptions.

Professional career

Los Angeles Rams (first stint)
Rozeboom was signed by the Los Angeles Rams as an undrafted free agent on April 26, 2020. He was waived on September 5, 2020, during final roster cuts and re-signed to the team's practice squad the following day. Rozeboom was signed to a reserve/futures contract with the Rams on January 18, 2021. He was waived on August 31, 2021, at the end of training camp.

Kansas City Chiefs
Rozeboom was signed to the Kansas City Chiefs' practice squad on September 1, 2021. He was elevated to the active roster on October 24, 2021, for the team's Week 7 game against the Tennessee Titans and made his NFL debut in the game, primarily playing on special teams. He also recorded his first career tackle in the game.

Los Angeles Rams (second stint)
On November 2, 2021, Rozeboom was signed off the Chiefs' practice squad by the Los Angeles Rams. Rozeboom won a Super Bowl ring when the Rams defeated the Cincinnati Bengals in Super Bowl LVI.

On March 15, 2023, Rozeboom was tendered by the Los Angeles Rams.

References

External links
South Dakota State Jackrabbits bio
Los Angeles Rams bio

1997 births
Living people
American football linebackers
Los Angeles Rams players
Kansas City Chiefs players
South Dakota State Jackrabbits football players
Players of American football from Iowa
People from Sioux Center, Iowa